Angourie Point is a surf break in the small township of Yamba on the north coast of New South Wales, Australia.  Angourie Point is an exposed point break that has consistent surf, and surf offshore winds are from the southwest. Groundswells and wind swells are good and the best swell direction is from the east or south east.

Wave info 
Type: Point break
Set up: Right-hander
Size range: 2ft to 10ft (~4 to 20 feet wave faces)
Offshore wind: West, North West, South west, South, South-South East.
Swell window: North East, East, South East, South (weak).
Nearest town: Yamba
Length of ride: Moderate, about 100-150m.

About Angourie Point 
 Crowd level:Busy
 Localism:Average
 Experience Level:Intermediate
 Dangers: Sharks, Rocks and locals. The surf break has an exposed rock section towards the end of the ride called 'life and death', and is a relatively dangerous ending to the wave when the swells are large.

Other nearby waves
Angourie or Back Lefts:

There is another low to medium quality left point break on the south side, which generally needs moderate size swells.

Type: Point break
Set up: Left-hander
Size range: 3ft to 10ft (~6 to 20 feet wave faces)
Offshore wind: West, North, North West, South west.
Swell window: North East, East, South East, South.
Nearest town: Yamba
Length of ride: Moderate, up to about 150m.
 
Angourie Beach break:

There is a decent beach break on the southern side of the point as well, which is protected in summer NE winds.

Spookies:

A short, very hollow right point break occurs just to the north, called Spookies, which tends to work in the same conditions as Angourie. It can hold even larger waves, when it breaks on another reef further out in the bay.

Type: Point break
Set up: Right-hander
Size range: 3ft to 12ft+ (~6 to 24+ feet wave faces)
Offshore wind: West, North West, South west.
Swell window: North East, East, South East, South (weak).
Nearest town: Yamba
Length of ride: Short, up to about 80-100m.

See also 
 List of surfing areas

References

External links
 
 

Surfing locations in New South Wales